Panopea zelandica, commonly known as the deepwater clam or New Zealand geoduck, is a large species of marine bivalve mollusc in the Panopea (geoduck) genus of the family Hiatellidae. It is also sometimes called a king clam, or a gaper – in reference to the shell not being closed at either end.

It is found around the North, South and Stewart islands and occurs mainly in shallow waters (5–25 metres) in sand and mud off sandy ocean beaches. Another geoduck species, Panopea smithae, is found in deeper New Zealand waters.

Like other geoducks, P. zelandica burrows downwards in the mud and extends a siphon 30-45 centimetres up to the surface of the substrate.  The siphon contains two tubes.  Water is sucked down one tube, filtered for food and then expelled through the other.

References

Hiatellidae
Bivalves of New Zealand
Bivalves described in 1835